Cachin is a surname. Notable people with the surname include:

Christian Cachin, Swiss cryptographer
Françoise Cachin (1936–2011), French art historian
Joseph Cachin (1757–1825), French engineer
Pedro Cachín (born 1995), Argentine tennis player 
Marcel Cachin (1869–1958), French politician